Westringia saxatilis is a species of plant in the mint family that is endemic to Australia.

Description
The species grows as a shrub to about 0.5–1 m in height. The leaves are 11–23 mm long and 3–5 mm wide, and are grouped around the stem in whorls of 3–5. The flowers are white with yellowish dots.

Distribution and habitat
The species is found in the Moruya district of south-eastern New South Wales, where it grows on rocky rhyolite outcrops in dense low shrubland.

References

saxatilis
Lamiales of Australia
Flora of New South Wales
Taxa named by Barry John Conn
Plants described in 1987